"The Last Sunset" is the eleventh episode of the first series of Space: 1999.  The screenplay was written by Christopher Penfold; the director was Charles Crichton.  The final shooting script is dated 21 July 1974, with blue-page amendments dated 22 July 1974 and pink-page amendments dated 23 July 1974.  Live-action filming took place Tuesday 23 July 1974 through Tuesday 6 August 1974.  A day of second-unit location work was completed on Wednesday 21 August 1974, during production of "Voyager's Return".

Story 

The Moon is moving into a solar system containing a single planet, which the Alpha staff code-names 'Ariel'.  While approaching with a two-ship reconnaissance mission, Alan Carter in Eagle Two comments that its dense atmosphere looks like pea soup.  Expectations are running high.  Not only is planet Ariel habitable, but conditions are favourable for the Moon to enter into orbit around its sun.  Preparations for final descent are interrupted by an unexpected sensor contact:  an alien object is closing fast.  Despite evasive manoeuvres, the object homes in on Eagle Two and impacts—without exploding.  Carter and co-pilot Pete Johnson are shocked to find it fastened to the outside of their command module.

John Koenig aborts the mission and orders Eagles Two and Seven to return to base.  Eagle Two is carefully brought down by remote-control...and the alien device still makes no move.  With the object proving resistant to all remote analysis techniques, it is removed from the Eagle fuselage and brought into a secure workshop in the Technical Section for a hands-on examination.  Carter wants to lead another mission to the planet.  Koenig insists on caution; the satellite hardly seems to be an invitation card—it could be a diversion to prevent them from landing on Ariel.

The alien device defies analysis, but Victor Bergman concludes it to be inert—just when it starts spraying jets of white vapour under high-pressure.  The workroom is sealed off, but the gas's tremendous pressure blows out the room's windows and ruptures the locked security door.  Technical Section is evacuated and its airlocks opened to expel the tainted air.  The mystery gas blasts through the Eagle maintenance hangar, geysering up the launch-pad elevator shaft.

Distracted by the venting operation, no one (except Tanya) notices the landing of countless more Ariel satellites.  The newly arrived devices emit more vapour until the moonscape is blanketed in a dense mist.  Bergman has performed a frantic analysis of the vapour and calls in the results—the mystery gas is air.  As the mist clears, the Alphans are astonished to see the sun rising above the lunar horizon into a dawn-flushed blue sky—the Moon now has an atmosphere.

The satellites depart (with the exception of the original sitting in Technical), but not before performing another scientific impossibility: the Moon's gravity is increased to near Earth-normal.  Helena Russell reviews the processed data and concludes the atmosphere to be breathable; though somewhat shallow by Earth standards, it even contains a protective ozone layer.  From an abundance of volunteers, Koenig chooses Paul Morrow and Sandra Benes for the final test—breathing the new air.  Out on the surface, they open valves in their spacesuits and begin breathing increasing portions of the outside atmosphere.  Finally, they open their helmet visors and take a deep breath; it smells like fresh country air.  The two joyfully embrace and try to kiss through the bulky space gear.

The next day, Alpha is transformed into a holiday resort, with people sun-bathing and playing badminton and other lawn games on the barren moonscape.  Morrow and Sandra go for a private stroll among the moonrocks.  The two discuss that, despite their feelings for each other, the thought of taking their relationship to the next level was unthinkable while cooped up inside Alpha.  Now, with the promise of a new life, the time has come to reconsider that decision and they passionately kiss.

Bergman obsesses over the formidable task of reclaiming the Moon surface.  The first major obstacle is the lack of water, though he is sure the rain cycle can be started with cloud-seeding.  Koenig feels their priority should be establishing if Ariel can support them.  As if eavesdropping, the satellite's antennae send bolts of energy streaming into the sky.  Heavy clouds accumulate and it begins to storm.  The people of Alpha scamper outside to experience this first rainfall.  Bergman is elated; as the rains continue, the Sea of Tranquility will become a genuine sea and all the craters will fill to form circular lakes.  Koenig gives him a reality check—Moonbase Alpha is built in a crater, and could soon be at the bottom of its own personal lake.

Koenig orders a survey of the Moon surface for an alternative place to live.  Eagle Two-Eight lifts off, crewed by Carter, Morrow and Sandra, with Helena as mission commander.  Hours into the flight, the Eagle encounters bad weather over the Taurus Mountains.  Elated at flying an aircraft again, Carter takes the ship into the clouds.  Back at Moonbase, Tanya and David Kano fret over the poor quality of telemetry received from the Eagle as it approaches an electrical storm—the interference is as bad as it was on Earth.

The Eagle is buffeted by high winds and Carter struggles to keep her aloft.  Lightning strikes the fuselage and all systems fail, short-circuited.  The ship plummets from the sky and crashes into a dust-dune on a barren plateau high in the mountains.  In Main Mission, the ship vanishes from tracking radar and contact is lost with the on-board computer.  Koenig organises a massive search effort and every serviceable Eagle is pressed into action.

At the crash site, Helena tends to an injured Sandra, finding fractured ribs and concussion.  Carter examines the ship's systems, finding burned-out electronics.  The men struggle to open the exterior hatch and dig through a suffocating drift of moondust to reach open air.  They catch sight of Eagle One flying away over the mountains—Koenig and crew have missed the nearly-buried wreck under its camouflage of dust.  Returning to Alpha long after nightfall, Koenig meets with Bergman, who is still optimistic that the Moon will assume orbit around this sun.  Koenig points out that if it does not, conditions outside will deteriorate rapidly.

The next day, in spite of the stifling heat, Carter and Morrow get to work.  They stack storage crates in a cross-shape to increase their visibility from the air.  Helena inventories their supplies.  She is dismayed to find the smashed tank of a corrosive chemical (normally stored in the engine compartment) thrown into the cargo section by the force of impact.  The acid has contaminated most of their consumables, leaving only survival rations and two containers of potable water.  At Alpha, Koenig receives a report that Eagle One-Five is the latest of six ships grounded by serious system failures.  He lambastes Kano over the apparent incompetence of the Technical Section.  His final word is that no Eagle will be grounded without his authorisation.

Night falls on the plateau and the temperature drops below freezing.  The wind picks up, piling dust-drifts over the marker.  Helena doles out their dinner ration of survival cubes and small tumblers of water.  The men watch the water supply dwindling and, mindful of Sandra's condition, agree to split one cup between them.  Helena will not allow it—for Sandra's sake, they must keep up their strength.

Koenig blasts off at dawn to lead the day's search.  His control systems suddenly seize up and the Eagle crash-lands just beyond the base perimeter.  Technical's analysis shows that an unknown element in the atmosphere, in combination with airborne particles of moondust, is causing all exposed metals to corrode—except for those coated with a graphite compound.  Koenig orders the base re-sealed and re-pressurised with its own atmosphere immediately, then an Eagle stripped down and graphite applied to every metal surface.  As an afterthought, he has the Ariel satellite dumped outside.

The wind storm continues through the next night at the crashed Eagle.  As the others sleep, Morrow sneaks extra water to Sandra.  She protests, but he lies to her about it having rained.  Watching her continued suffering, he makes a desperate decision—he will try to reach Alpha on foot and get help.  Under the guise of fetching water, he leaves before the others awaken.  Unable to withstand the gale-force wind, Morrow soon collapses to the ground.  Reaching out, he encounters a mushroom-like growth under a rock; with nothing to lose, he first squeezes liquid out of the fungus to drink, then takes a bite.

Sunrise brings clear skies and finds Morrow alive and with renewed strength.  He has built a shelter out of odds and ends overnight.  Bringing Sandra out to lie in the open air, he declares his shack to be the new city of Alpha in this de facto Garden of Eden.  He offers the others breakfast:  the 'manna from Heaven' delivered unto him when he lay down to die.  Carter is willing to try, but Helena insists on testing it first.  Back at Alpha, Bergman reports the Moon will not be going into orbit.  Koenig is grim; once they leave this sun, the atmosphere will freeze and crush Moonbase.  A small consolation, the corrosion-proof Eagle is ready and Koenig resumes the search for Helena and the others.

Having no real choice, Helena clears the mushroom substance for consumption; she will conduct proper tests when they return to Alpha.  With a fanatical intensity, Morrow declares they will not be going back.  Recent events have guided them to their destiny: to foster a new civilisation on the Moon, then spread humanity out across the stars.  Carter returns in time to witness Morrow's harangue and drop-kicks his gathered 'manna' into the dust.  Morrow proceeds to beat him senseless over his sacrilegious treatment of this 'sacred bread'.  Helena moves to sedate Morrow, but he evades the hypo-gun and grabs her by the throat.

Helena′s life is saved by the return of the Ariel satellites.  As Morrow revels in the 'second coming' of the people of Ariel, she spots Koenig's Eagle in the distance.  She runs for the wreck of Eagle Two-Eight and opens the valves on every oxygen cylinder.  Back outside, she fires a laser rifle into the ship.  The laser charge ignites the flammable gas, blowing the ship apart.  Koenig's instruments indicate atmospheric pressure is falling—the satellites are back to remove the atmosphere.  He spots the column of smoke from the burning Eagle and touches down.

Koenig leaves Bob Mathias to assist Carter and Helena while he goes to retrieve Sandra from the shelter.  He is attacked by a psychotic Morrow preaching his new-found dogma.  As the air thins, the two men fight until Koenig lays Morrow out with a right cross to the chin.  After their return to Alpha, Bergman reports to the senior executives that Morrow's 'manna' has high nutritional potential—once the hallucinogenic elements are removed.

The last of the departing satellites pauses and focuses a ray on the Main Mission building.  An alien voice states their actions were neither benevolent nor malevolent.  Koenig's suspicions were correct—by making the Moon habitable, they prevented Earthmen from penetrating their planet.  The Commander insists their intentions were peaceful.  The Ariel voice replies they have observed Earth since the beginning of time; human nature is such they are unwilling to take the risk.

Contact is broken and the satellite flies away.  As the last of the temporary atmosphere dissipates and the sun sinks toward the horizon, the people of Alpha linger at Main Mission's windows to see their last sunset.

Cast

Starring 

 Martin Landau — Commander John Koenig
 Barbara Bain — Doctor Helena Russell

Also Starring 

 Barry Morse — Professor Victor Bergman

Featuring 

 Prentis Hancock — Controller Paul Morrow
 Clifton Jones — David Kano
 Zienia Merton — Sandra Benes
 Anton Phillips — Doctor Bob Mathias
 Nick Tate — Captain Alan Carter

Uncredited Artists 

 Suzanne Roquette — Tanya
 James Fagan — Astronaut Pete Johnson
 Quentin Pierre — Security Guard
 Sarah Bullen — Kate

Music 

In addition to the Space: 1999 Barry Gray score (drawn primarily from "Matter of Life and Death" and "Black Sun"), music tracks from the previous Gerry Anderson television productions Joe 90, The Secret Service, Stingray, Supercar and the film Thunderbird 6 also composed by Gray were utilised.

Production Notes 

 This story was one of the original outlines conceived for the writers' bible.  Executive producer Gerry Anderson thought that effects supervisor Brian Johnson would be able to save money by filming most of the visual effects against the real sky and with natural lighting.  As it turns out, the wires supporting the models were always visible; the method would have cost much more than filming in the Bray Studios' stages and the idea was abandoned.
 This episode featured the first location filming for the series with the scenes set on the Moon surface during the rain storm.  Erecting some modular flats to represent the Moonbase airlock exterior, this sequence was shot in the Pinewood Studios car-park two weeks after principal photography was completed.
 This episode highlights the Morrow-Benes romance (whose tenuous beginnings were seen in "Black Sun") evolving into a true relationship in this story.  A line of dialogue was trimmed directly before the kissing scene where, after Morrow guesses wrong, Sandra was supposed to answer her own question 'Do you know the sound I miss most in the silence of space?' with the reply, 'The sound of children.'  Both actress Zienia Merton and director Charles Crichton felt this made the character seem too desperate on what was essentially a first date and they substituted an enigmatic look.
 Scenes shot, but cut from the final print include: (1) A segment in the Technical Section where technicians replace the shattered window with a panel that can be opened.  The end of the scene is left in where the window is opened and Koenig, Bergman and Helena are shown enjoying the breeze; (2) A line trimmed from the later scene where they discover the corrosive quality of the atmosphere (but retained for clarity in the above synopsis) has Koenig ordering all the windows replaced.  With these two cuts, many viewers were left with the impression that the Alpha windows were always able to be opened; (3) More bits with Bergman poring over maps and satellite photos, proclaiming where rivers would flow and cities should be built were trimmed for time.
 "The Last Sunset" is the only episode of the first series to feature only the regular cast and background extras.  Zienia Merton recalls, though, early drafts had the Paul-Morrow-as-hallucinating-prophet role written for an Italian guest artist.  As the filming date approached, the actor became unavailable at the time of filming, and his material was given to Prentis Hancock.
 The Italian edition was lost in the RAI buildings, but with many registrations of the series, was taken by a worker of a closed company, then, after many vicissitudes, the episode was transmitted, but the first minutes are with English audio!

Novelisation 

The episode was adapted in the second Year One Space: 1999 novel Moon Odyssey by John Rankine, published in 1975.

References

External links 
Space: 1999 - "The Last Sunset" - The Catacombs episode guide
Space: 1999 - "The Last Sunset" - Moonbase Alpha's Space: 1999 page

1976 British television episodes
Space: 1999 episodes